"Caribbean Clipper" is a big band and jump song recorded by Glenn Miller and his Orchestra in 1942. The song was composed by Jerry Gray with lyrics by Sammy Gallop.  The song was part of a number of songs—including "Sun Valley Jump", "Here We Go Again", "The Spirit Is Willing", "The Man in the Moon" and "A String of Pearls"—written by Gray, a member of the Glenn Miller 
Orchestra as an arranger, specially for Glenn Miller, who recorded it in 1943.  The song was registered with the United States Copyright Office on October 23, 1942, by the Mutual Music Society.

Recordings

Glenn Miller

Miller recorded a number of versions of the song, some of which were broadcast on radio programs such as his Chesterfield Broadcasts in 1942. He released the song through Victor in 1943, as the B-side to "Blue Rain".  This recording featured Maurice Purtill on drums and Mel Powell on piano. Billboard magazine ran an advert for the release that stated that "no hep nickel will miss this one!". Miller made a recording for the Treasury Star Parade—syndicated by the United States Department of the Treasury—on February 11, 1944.  This recording was included on Magic Records' compilation The Glenn Miller Service Orchestra in the USA and Europe (Volume II).

Miller also recorded a version of the song directly for broadcast on CBS Radio's I Sustain the Wings show.  The recording was made at the war bond rally at the Chicago Theatre on April 15, 1944.

Miller later recorded the song in Studio One at Abbey Road Studios (then known as EMI Studios) on November 27, 1944, as part of a propaganda broadcast.  Recorded under the name "The American Band of the Allied Expeditionary Force", the session became Miller's last recording session before his disappearance.  The broadcast was later issued on a number of albums as The Lost Recordings.

Personnel
The personnel for Miller's Abbey Road recording were:

Brass
Zeke Zarchy (trumpet)
Bernie Privin (trumpet)
Bobby Nichols (trumpet)
Whitey Thomas (trumpet)
Jack Steele (trumpet)
Jimmy Priddy (trombone)
John Halliburton (trombone)
Larry Hall (trombone)
Nat Peck (trombone)
Addison Collins (french horn)
Woodwind
Hank Freeman (alto saxophone)
Peanuts Hucko (alto saxophone, tenor saxophone, clarinet)
Vince Carbone (tenor saxophone)
Jack Ferrier (tenor saxophone)
Freddy Guerra (alto saxophone)
Manny Thaler (baritone saxophone, alto saxophone, bass clarinet, clarinet)
Piano
Mel Powell
Guitar
Carmen Mastren
Double bass
Trigger Alpert
Drums
Ray McKinley

A number of strings musicians were part of the ensemble, but the song's orchestration did not require their performance.

Other versions
In August and September 1950, a band led by Gray—billed as the "Ex-Glenn Miller Men" and including musicians such as Willie Schwartz, Jimmy Priddy and Johnny Best—performed the song at the Hollywood Palladium; a recording of the concert was released through Jazz Hour Records.  The song was performed by the BBC Big Band as part of their Glenn Miller tribute concert at Birmingham Town Hall on November 14, 2011. Other artists to record versions of the song include the Syd Lawrence Orchestra and Joe Loss.

References

External links
Online version. Archive.org. "Caribbean Clipper", track 9.
"Caribbean Clipper" recorded by Glenn Miller and the Army Air Force Band on March 10, 1944 in New York City, track 8.
February 11, 1944, Treasury Star Parade recording of "Caribbean Clipper" by Glenn Miller and the Army Air Force Band.

1942 songs
Glenn Miller songs
RCA Records singles
Songs with lyrics by Sammy Gallop
Songs with music by Jerry Gray (arranger)